The large moth family Gelechiidae contains the following genera:

Cacelice
Calliphylla
Calliprora
Canthonistis
Capnosema
Carpatolechia
Cartericella
Caryocolum
Catalexis
Catameces
Catatinagma
Cathegesis
Caulastrocecis
Cauloecista
Cecidonostola
Celetodes
Cerofrontia
Chalcomima
Chaliniastis
Charistica
Chilopselaphus
Chionodes
Chlorolychnis
Chorivalva
Chretienella
Chrysoesthia
Clepsimacha
Clepsimorpha
Clistothyris
Cnaphostola
Cochlevalva
Coconympha
Coleostoma
Coleotechnites
Colonanthes
Coloptilia
Commatica
Compsolechia
Compsosaris
Coniogyra
Coproptilia
Copticostola
Corynaea
Cosmardia
Coudia
Coydalla
Crambodoxa
Crasimorpha
Craspedotis
Cratinitis
Crypsimaga
Curvisignella

References

 Natural History Museum Lepidoptera genus database

Gelechiidae
Gelechiid